GFR  may refer to:
 Gas-cooled fast reactor
 Gefreiter
 General fertility rate
 Glomerular filtration rate
 Government Flight Representative
 Grand Forks Railway, a Canadian railway
 Grand Funk Railroad, an American rock band
 Grup Feroviar Român, a Romanian railway freight company
 Guinean franc